Francis Mer (born 25 May 1939, in Pau) is a French businessman, industrialist and politician. A former alumnus of the École Polytechnique, and of the École des Mines de Paris, he is a member of the Corps des mines. He was hired in 1970 by the Saint-Gobain group. In 1982, he became chairman of the board of Pont-à-Mousson SA. In the 1980s, he joined the Saint-Simon Foundation think-tank.

Following the 1986 legislative elections and the nomination of the conservative Jacques Chirac as Prime Minister, he was nominated as president of the new Usinor group. He was reelected to his position in 1995, upon the group's privatization, and renamed the group Arcelor in 2002. From 2002 to 2004, he was Minister of Finances in Jean-Pierre Raffarin's conservative government.

Since 2005, he sits on the board of directors of Vale Inco, which benefited from an important tax rebate to exploit a nickel mine in New Caledonia while he was finance minister.

In June 2009, he became chairman of the board of Safran.

In April 2011, due to the change of structure of Safran, Jean-Paul Herteman became CEO and Francis Mer became Vice Chairman.

Notes

1939 births
Living people
French chief executives
École Polytechnique alumni
Mines Paris - PSL alumni
Corps des mines
Politicians of the French Fifth Republic
French Ministers of Finance
Safran Group people